Melvin Thomas Ott (March 2, 1909 – November 21, 1958), nicknamed "Master Melvin", was an American professional baseball right fielder, who played in Major League Baseball (MLB) for the New York Giants, from  through .

He batted left-handed and threw right-handed. He was an All-Star for 11 consecutive seasons, and was the first National League player to surpass 500 career home runs.

He was elected to the National Baseball Hall of Fame in 1951.

Early life
Ott was born in Gretna, Louisiana, a suburb of New Orleans. Despite his average height, he quickly established himself as a gifted athlete, especially in baseball. During high school, he played on a semi-pro team three or four days a week. He already showed considerable power at a young age and was getting paid for it. His team had a tradition of passing the hat whenever a player hit a home run that figured in a victory, meaning Ott was taking home money for playing baseball as early as 14.

Playing career
Despite his power, Ott's hometown minor league team, the New Orleans Pelicans, refused to sign him because of concerns about his size. He then found a job at a lumber company in Patterson, near Morgan City, where he became a sensation on the company baseball team. Company owner Henry Williams was particularly impressed with Ott. While visiting New York, he suggested that Giants manager John McGraw give him a tryout. Ott was skeptical at first, so Williams bought Ott a train ticket to New York .

Ott arrived in New York in early September. He quickly impressed observers with his hitting, especially McGraw, who predicted that he would be "one of the greatest lefthand hitters the National League has ever seen." He formally signed Ott to a contract in January 1926.

Regular season
Ott had originally been a catcher, but McGraw concluded that Ott was too small to be a major league catcher and converted him into an outfielder. After two years as a part-time player, he became the regular right fielder in 1929 at the age of 20. He didn't disappoint, powering 42 home runs and collecting 151 RBIs—both records for players who were 20 years old or younger at the start of the season.

Ott was a six-time NL home run leader, in 1932, 1934, 1936–1938, and 1942. From 1928 through 1945, he led the New York Giants in home runs. This 18-season consecutive dominance is a record; no other player has ever led his team in more consecutive years in a single Triple Crown category. He was both the youngest player to hit 100 home runs and the first National Leaguer to hit 500 home runs.

Ott was noted for reaching base via the base on balls (BB), or walk. He drew five walks in a game three times. He set the National League record for most walks in a doubleheader, with six, on October 5, 1929, and did it again on April 30, 1944. He tied an MLB record by drawing a walk in seven consecutive plate appearances (June 16–18, 1943). He also led the NL in walks six times: in 1929, 1931–1933, 1937, and 1942.

He twice scored six runs in a game, on August 4, 1934, and on April 30, 1944. He is the youngest major leaguer to ever hit for the cycle. Ott was the first NL player to post eight consecutive 100-RBI seasons, and only Willie Mays, Sammy Sosa, Chipper Jones, and Albert Pujols have since joined him.

He used a batting style that was then considered unorthodox, lifting his forward (right) foot prior to impact. When McGraw first saw Ott's style, he called it "the most natural swing I've seen in years. Alvin Dark said that Ott "lifted his lead foot right off the ground like he was getting ready to kick at a dog". This style helped him hit for power. More recent players who used a similar style include Harold Baines and Kirby Puckett, as well as the Japanese home run king, Sadaharu Oh.

In 1943, all of his 18 home runs came at home; only two other players ever had a greater number of all-homefield home runs. Of Ott's 511 career home runs, 323 of them, or 63%, came at home. Because of this, his home run record historically has been downplayed, suggesting that a  foul line at the Polo Grounds resulted in higher numbers at home. Sportswriters often jokingly referred to him as the master of the "Chinese home run" as such short homers were called at the time; Ott would often respond by noting that if it was so easy to inflate his homer totals by hitting over that fence, all other hitters in the league would be doing it.

As a balance, the Polo Grounds had the deepest power alleys in baseball. Also, he hit more career home runs in foreign stadiums than any other National League hitter at the time of his retirement. In some of his better seasons, he hit more homers on the road than in the Polo Grounds.

There may be reason to believe that he was a better hitter than his record suggests because of differences in National League and American League ball specifications. Those differences are considered the greatest in the history of the game and made it considerably harder for National League hitters to achieve home runs.

Ott was also a skilled fielder. He was a master at playing balls that bounced off the fences at the Polo Grounds, allowing him to garner 26 assists in 1929, his first full season as a full-time player. He would never even approach that figure again, as baserunners quickly realized it was far too risky to run on balls hit in Ott's direction.

During the prime of Ott's career, 11 seasons from 1931 to 1941, American League batters averaged 21% more home runs—peaking at 41% more home runs—than their National League counterparts. Babe Ruth and Jimmie Foxx, contemporaries, and both American League players, were the only batters to surpass Ott's record during this time.

Post-season
Ott played in the World Series in 1933, 1936, and 1937, winning in 1933. He hit two home runs during the 1933 series. In Game 1, he had four hits, including a two-run home run in the first inning. In Game 5, he drove in the series-winning run with two outs in the top of the 10th, driving a pitch into the center-field bleachers. In the 1936 World Series, Ott had seven hits and one home run. In 1937, he had 4 hits and 1 home run. Playing in 16 World Series games, Ott batted .295 (18-for-61) with eight runs, four home runs and ten RBI.

Career statistics
In his 22-season career, Ott batted .304 with 511 home runs, 1,860 RBIs, 1,859 runs, 2,876 hits, 488 doubles, 72 triples, 89 stolen bases, 1,708 BB, .414 on-base percentage and a .533 slugging average. Defensively, he recorded a .974 fielding percentage. He hit better than .300 10 times in his major league career. At the time of his retirement, he had hit 200 more home runs than the next-highest National Leaguer.

Managerial career
After longtime teammate Bill Terry retired as manager in 1941, he named Ott as player-manager. Ott continued as a regular player for another five years, and remained productive at the plate for much of that time. In 1942, he led the league in home runs, runs scored, and walks. He finished second in home runs and third in slugging percentage in 1944. In 1945, he hit .308 and finished tied for fourth in home runs.
 
On the second day of the 1946 season, a day after hitting what would be his final career home run, he injured his knee while diving for a fly ball. The injury effectively ended his career; he only appeared in 29 more games for the rest of 1946, and retired after making only four cameo appearances in 1947. He stayed on as manager until Leo Durocher replaced him midway through the 1948 season.

The Giants' best finish during Ott's tenure was third place in 1942, one of only three times he finished with a winning record. However, his 1943 and 1944 teams were decimated by World War II, which saw a number of established players drafted into the military.

It was in reference to Ott's supposedly easy-going managing style that then-Dodgers manager Durocher made the oft-quoted and somewhat out-of-context comment, "Nice guys finish last!" Ott was the first manager to be ejected from both games of a doubleheader, when the Giants lost both games to the Pittsburgh Pirates on June 9, 1946.

Ott spent the remaining two-and-a-half years of his contract helping his former teammate Carl Hubbell run the Giants' farm system. In 1951, Ott succeeded Chuck Dressen as manager of the Oakland Oaks of the Pacific Coast League, leading the club to an 80–88 finish (seventh place). In 1952, the Oaks finished 104-76 under Ott, good for second place in the PCL.

MLB honors

Ott was elected to the Baseball Hall of Fame in 1951 with 87.2% of the vote.

He was a National League All-Star for 11 consecutive seasons, from 1934 through 1944 (All-Star selections only began in 1933; Ott had at least three All-Star caliber seasons prior to that, as well as in 1945, when MLB cancelled the 1945 contest and selections).

He is one of only six National League players to spend a 20+ year career with one team (Cap Anson, Stan Musial, Willie Stargell, Tony Gwynn, and Craig Biggio being the others).

He was a nominee for the Major League Baseball All-Century Team.

Broadcasting career

Ott spent the 1953 and 1954 seasons out of baseball for the first time since coming to New York in 1925.  In 1955, he joined the Mutual radio network to recreate baseball games. From 1956 to 1958, Ott teamed with Van Patrick to broadcast the games of the Detroit Tigers on radio and television.

Death
Ott was injured in an auto accident in Bay Saint Louis, Mississippi, in November 1958. He was transferred to a hospital in New Orleans, where he died a week later at the age of 49. He was interred in Metairie Cemetery. Ott died in a similar manner to two other New York Giants Hall of Famers: Frankie Frisch in 1973 and Carl Hubbell in 1988.

Legacy
Ott is remembered in his hometown of Gretna, where a park is named in his honor. Since 1959, the National League has honored the league's annual home run champion with the Mel Ott Award. In the 1989 film Field of Dreams, Ott was one of several deceased players portrayed in farmer Ray Kinsella's Iowa cornfield. In 2006, Ott was featured on a United States postage stamp, as one of a block of four honoring "Baseball Sluggers" — the others being Mickey Mantle, Hank Greenberg, and Roy Campanella. In announcing the stamps, the U.S. Postal Service stated, "Remembered as powerful hitters who wowed fans with awesome and often record-breaking home runs, these four men were also versatile players who helped to lead their teams to victory and set impressive standards for subsequent generations." Ott is also remembered in the name of the Little League of Amherst, New York. The Mel Ott Little League began in 1959, named for Ott soon after his death.

Ott's name frequently appears in crossword puzzles, on account of its letter combination and brevity.

Ott is mentioned in the poem "Line-Up for Yesterday" by Ogden Nash, first published in Sport magazine in January 1949:

Baseball records and accomplishments

Home runs
 Six-time NL home run leader (1932, 1934, 1936–1938, 1942).
 Was the youngest player to hit 100 and 200 home runs, and the first NL player to reach 500 home runs.
 Holds major league record by leading his team 18 consecutive years in home runs (1928–1945).

Walks
 Drew five walks in a game three times, and six walks in a doubleheader twice.
 Shares MLB record by drawing a walk in seven consecutive plate appearances (June 16 through 18, 1943).
 Led NL in walks six times (1929, 1931–1933, 1937, 1942).

Other offense
 Twice scored six runs in a game (August 4, 1934 and April 30, 1944).
 Hit for the cycle (May 16, 1929).
 First NL player to post eight consecutive 100-RBI seasons (only Willie Mays, Sammy Sosa, Chipper Jones, and Albert Pujols have joined him).

Defense
 Twice led NL outfielders in double plays (1929 and 1935).

Overall
 11-time All-Star (1934–1944) and four time The Sporting News All-Star (1934–1936, 1938).
 In 1999, he ranked number 42 on The Sporting News' list of the 100 Greatest Baseball Players and was a nominee for the MLB All-Century Team.
 One of six NL players to play more than 20 years with one team (Cap Anson, Stan Musial, Willie Stargell, Craig Biggio, and Tony Gwynn are the others).
 He managed the New York Giants in seven seasons (1942–1948).

See also

List of baseball players who went directly to Major League Baseball
List of Major League Baseball home run records
500 home run club
List of Major League Baseball individual streaks
List of Major League Baseball career home run leaders
List of Major League Baseball career hits leaders
List of Major League Baseball career doubles leaders
List of Major League Baseball career runs scored leaders
List of Major League Baseball career runs batted in leaders
List of Major League Baseball career total bases leaders
List of Major League Baseball players to hit for the cycle
List of Major League Baseball annual runs batted in leaders
List of Major League Baseball annual home run leaders
List of Major League Baseball annual runs scored leaders
List of Major League Baseball player-managers
List of Major League Baseball players who spent their entire career with one franchise
Major League Baseball titles leaders

Notes

References

Further reading

 1933 World Series at MLB.com

External links

Nel Ott st SABR (Baseball BioProject)

1909 births
1958 deaths
People from Gretna, Louisiana
American Lutherans
Baseball players from Louisiana
Detroit Tigers announcers
Major League Baseball broadcasters
Major League Baseball player-managers
Major League Baseball players with retired numbers
Major League Baseball right fielders
National Baseball Hall of Fame inductees
National League All-Stars
National League home run champions
National League RBI champions
New York Giants (NL) players
New York Giants (NL) managers
Oakland Oaks (baseball) managers
Road incident deaths in Louisiana
Burials at Metairie Cemetery
American sportsmen
20th-century Lutherans